Ossi Oikarinen (born 3 May 1970) is a Finnish engineer who works in Formula One.

References
 T-lehti.fi -- Työelämä  

1970 births
Living people
Formula One engineers
Finnish motorsport people